Bergstraße (English: Mountain Road) is an electoral constituency (German: Wahlkreis) represented in the Bundestag. It elects one member via first-past-the-post voting. Under the current constituency numbering system, it is designated as constituency 188. It is located in southern Hesse, comprising the district of Bergstraße.

Bergstraße was created for the inaugural 1949 federal election. Since 2005, it has been represented by Michael Meister of the Christian Democratic Union (CDU).

Geography
Bergstraße is located in southern Hesse. As of the 2021 federal election, it is coterminous with the district of Bergstraße.

History
Bergstraße was created in 1949. In the 1949 election, it was Hesse constituency 22 in the numbering system. From 1953 through 1976, it was number 147. From 1980 through 1998, it was number 145. In the 2002 and 2005 elections, it was number 189. Since the 2009 election, it has been number 188.

Originally, the constituency was coterminous with the district of Bergstraße. In the 1965 through 1972 elections, it also contained the municipality of Rothenberg from the Erbach district. Since the 1976 election, it has again been coterminous with the Bergstraße district.

Members
The constituency was first represented by Heinrich von Brentano of the Christian Democratic Union (CDU) from 1949 to 1965, followed by Carl Otto Lenz of the CDU until 1969. Wolfgang Schwabe won it for the Social Democratic Party (SPD) in 1969 and served until 1976, when former member Lenz regained it for the CDU. Klaus Kübler won it back to the SPD in 1980, but Lenz was once again elected in 1983. Fellow CDU member Franz-Hermann Kappes then served from 1987 to 1994, followed by Michael Meister until 1998. Christine Lambrecht of the SPD won the constituency in 1998 and was representative until 2005. Former member Meister was elected again in 2005, and re-elected in 2009, 2013, 2017, and 2021.

Election results

2021 election

2017 election

2013 election

2009 election

References

Federal electoral districts in Hesse
1949 establishments in West Germany
Constituencies established in 1949
Bergstraße (district)